Joseph Thornton may refer to:

 Joseph Thornton (bookseller) (1808–1891), founder of Thornton's Bookshop in Oxford, England
 Joseph William Thornton, founder of the British chocolate brand Thorntons
 Joseph Thornton (biologist) (born 1965), American evolutionary biologist
 Joseph Thornton (contractor) (1804–1889), railway contractor in England
 Joe Thornton (born 1979), Canadian ice hockey centre
 Joe Thornton (archer), Cherokee archer